The 2021 Northern Illinois Huskies football team represented Northern Illinois University as a member of the West Division of the Mid-American Conference (MAC) during the 2021 NCAA Division I FBS football season. Led by third-year head coach Thomas Hammock, the Huskies compiled an overall record of 9–5 with a mark of 6–2 in conference playing, sharing the MAC's West Division title with Central Michigan. By virtue of a head-to-head win over Central Michigan, Northern Illinois advanced to the MAC Championship Game and defeated Kent State to win the program's six MAC championship. The Huskies invited to the Cure Bowl, where they lost to Coastal Carolina on December 17. The team played home games at Huskie Stadium in DeKalb, Illinois.

On November 9, the school announced that Hammock had signed a contract extension through the 2026 season. With their win over Buffalo on November 17, the Huskies clinched the West Division championship and a berth in the MAC Championship Game.

Previous season
In a season initially canceled and then reinstated with a limited schedule due to the ongoing COVID-19 pandemic, the Huskies finished the 2020 season 0–6 in a conference-only schedule to finish in last place in the West Division.

Offseason

Transfers
As a result of the limited season in 2020 due to COVID-19, the NCAA granted a waiver to allow athletes to transfer to another school and be eligible immediately without having to sit out a season. In April 2021, the NCAA further made one-time transfers for all college athletes to be eligible immediately. As a result, transfers were much more common this year than in prior years.

Michigan State quarterback Rocky Lombardi, who started six games for the Spartans in 2020, announced he would transfer to Northern Illinois.

Preseason
In the league's annual preseason poll, the Huskies were picked to finish in last place in the West.

Schedule
The Huskies played Maine and Wyoming at home while traveling to Georgia Tech and Michigan for non-conference games in 2021.

Rankings

Game Summaries

vs. Georgia Tech

References

Northern Illinois
Northern Illinois Huskies football seasons
Mid-American Conference football champion seasons
Northern Illinois Huskies football